Raymond Omernick (1923–2007) was a member of the Wisconsin State Assembly.

Biography

Omernick was born on May 24, 1923 in Franzen, Wisconsin. He was a farmer and logger. He married Victoria Zoromski on October 13, 1953 at St. Mary's Catholic Church in Torun, Wisconsin. They would reside in Wittenberg, Wisconsin and have five children.

Omernick died on August 22, 2007 in an automobile accident. He is buried in Rosholt, Wisconsin.

Career

Omernick was elected to the Assembly in 1978, defeating incumbent Laurence J. Day. He was defeated for re-election in the Republican primary in 1980 by John L. McEwen and in the general election as a write-in candidate. Previously, he had been a municipal judge from 1977 to 1979.

References

People from Marathon County, Wisconsin
People from Wittenberg, Wisconsin
Republican Party members of the Wisconsin State Assembly
Municipal judges in the United States
1923 births
2007 deaths
Road incident deaths in Wisconsin
20th-century American politicians
20th-century American judges